Princess Isabelle Françoise Hélène Marie d'Orléans (27 November 1900, Le Nouvion-en-Thiérache, France – 12 February 1983, Neuilly-sur-Seine, France) was a member of the House of Orléans and, by marriage, a member of the ducal Harcourt family and of the princely House of Murat.

She was one of the four children of Prince Jean, Duke of Guise (1874–1940), who would become the Orleanist pretender to the French throne in 1926, and his wife Princess Isabelle of Orléans. Although born in France, her parents moved the family to Morocco in 1909, then a French colony. She was with her mother and siblings visiting France when World War I broke out in 1914. While her father sought in vain to obtain permission from the French government to serve in the military, the rest of the family hastened back to Morocco.

Marriages
In 1923 the tradition of Orléans princesses marrying only other royalty (since the alleged 1681 wedding of La Grande Mademoiselle) was dispensed with, as nearly all of her relatives attended Isabelle's wedding at Amélie of Orléans château in Le Chesnay on 12 September to Count Bruno d'Harcourt (1899–1930), son of Count Eugène d'Harcourt and Armande de Pierre de Bernis. An automobile racer, Harcourt was killed during practice for the Moroccan Grand Prix, leaving his wife with four children:

 Count Bernard d'Harcourt (1 January 1925 – 4 September 1958). His first marriage, on 4 November 1948, to Zénaïde Rachewska (1930 - 1973), ended in divorce and was childless. He wed secondly on 27 January 1951 Yvonne de Contades (born 22 April 1928), and had issue from his second marriage:
 Count Bruno Jean d'Harcourt (born 26 October 1951)
 Count François d'Harcourt (born 21 June 1953) married 4 July 1981 Colombe Anouilh (born 7 October 1956, daughter of Jean Anouilh and Nicole Lançon), with issue:
 Gilone d'Harcourt  (born 1 January 1927 – 14 March 2019) married in 1950 Count Antoine de Dreux-Brézé (born 22 August 1928), and has issue.
 Isabelle d'Harcourt  (1927–1993) married 20 October 1948 Prince Louis Murat (1920-2004); son of Prince Paul Murat and Solange de La Rochefoucauld), and had issue.
 Monique d'Harcourt (born 7 January 1929) married 3 July 1948 Alfred Boulay de la Meurthe (born 26 July 1925; and has issue, including:
 Gilone Boulay de la Meurthe (born 25 April 1949) married in 1975 Count Renaud de Clermont-Tonnerre (born 16 October 1950; son of Count Marie-Amédée de Clermont-Tonnerre and Rosanne Tailleferre); and has issue.
 Laure Boulay de la Meurthe (born 27 April 1951), sometime publisher of Point de Vue, who has issue with Sir James Goldsmith.
 Yseult Boulay de la Meurthe (born 19 April 1956) married 25 August 1979 Alexandre de Blacas d'Aulps (20 December 1944 - 30 January 2003), son of Pierre, 6th Duc de Blacas, and Hélène de Blacas d'Aulps; and has issue.

As a widow, Isabelle remarried the Bonapartist Prince Pierre Murat (1900–1948) in 1934, at Jouy-en-Josas, "upon renunciation of the rank and prerogatives appertaining to princesses of the House of France". Prince Murat was a  great-grandson of Prince Lucien Murat. No children were born of this marriage. In 1940, as World War II began and when her father died, Isabelle again took refuge at the family estate, Larache, in Morocco, where she shared quarters with her mother, and her elder sister the widowed Princess Françoise of Greece, along with her brother Henri, Count of Paris and the latter's son, Prince Michel d'Orléans.

Ancestry

References

1900 births
1983 deaths
Princesses of France (Orléans)